Gringo-Gaucho are a contingent set of maneuvers performed between the Argentine Naval Aviation and United States Navy's aircraft carriers. The US Navy refers to them as Southern Seas in their last edition. Gringo and Gaucho are linguistic and folkloric designations of long standing, respectively.

History

The Argentine Navy continuously operated an aircraft carrier from 1959 to 1990. When ARA Veinticinco de Mayo was retired, it was decided to keep an embarked air group with the hope of operating a carrier again in the future. In order to qualify the pilots, the traditional friendship with the Brazilian Navy allowed Argentine naval aviators to operate from the deck of the Brazilian aircraft carriers Minas Gerais and São Paulo during ARAEX exercises. The only other choice available was with the United States. As the United States Navy does not maintain regular deployments of aircraft carriers in the South Atlantic it is necessary to wait for one of them to perform a transit within Argentine coastal waters. The opportunities occur when the ships perform a transit around South America to move between the East and West coasts of the United States since they are too large for the Panama Canal. The exercise is coordinated by US Naval Forces Southern Command, but unlike the Sao Paulo the Argentine aircraft solely perform touch-and-go landings.

Aircraft
 Dassault-Breguet Super Étendard ( 2da Escuadrilla Aeronaval de Caza y Ataque )
 Grumman/IAI S-2T Turbo Tracker ( Naval Antisubmarine Squadron )
 Alouette III and Eurocopter Fennec ( 1st Naval Helicopter Squadron ) as SAR aircraft
 Sikorsky/Agusta S-61 Sea King ( 2nd Naval Helicopter Squadron ) for general support duties

List of operations
 1990, March:  on transit for her Service Life Extension Program (SLEP)
 1990, October: 
 1991, November: , including port visit to Mar del Plata
 1993: USS Constellation on the way back to the Pacific Ocean after SLEP
 2001: . Cancelled due budget restrictions per Argentine economic crisis
 2004: video
 2008:
 2010: video

Gallery

See also
South America air forces maneuvers

References

 Carl Vinson Unites with Argentina for Southern Seas 2010 
 Argentina-United States in joint exercise

Argentine Naval Aviation
Military exercises involving the United States
Military aviation exercises